Clinton Scott Hill (born 19 October 1978) is an English former professional footballer who played as a defender. He is currently assistant manager of National League side Stockport County.

Hill began his career with local side Tranmere Rovers in 1997. He broke into the first team and became a regular as Rovers reached the League Cup final in 2000. Hill was sent-off however as Tranmere lost 2–1. He remained at Prenton Park until 2002 when he joined Oldham Athletic and after impressing there he was signed by Championship side Stoke City. His first season with Stoke was cut down due to injuries which hampered his time at the club. He left for Crystal Palace after making 84 appearances for Stoke in five years.

At Palace he played well despite the club struggling financially and when manager Neil Warnock joined Queens Park Rangers Hill followed him in July 2010. In his first season at Loftus Road QPR won the Championship and gained promotion to the Premier League. They went on to ensure survival on the final day of the season, Hill winning the supporters player of the year award for his performances this despite playing 25 matches and also spending a short time on loan at Nottingham Forest.

Playing career

Tranmere Rovers
Born in Huyton, Merseyside, Hill began his career as a trainee at Tranmere Rovers, where he made his debut during a 2–2 draw against Nottingham Forest in the 1997–98 season. By the 1998–99 season Hill had become a regular starter in the Tranmere side and was part of the team which played in the 2000 English League Cup Final at Wembley Stadium against Leicester City. However Hill was sent-off during the game and Tranmere lost the match 2–1. Hill made 140 appearances during his five years in the Tranmere first team.

Oldham Athletic
A£250,000 move to Oldham Athletic in 2002 saw him make just 17 league starts in one season before it was cut short when Hill broke his leg during a League Cup tie against Crystal Palace in December 2002, which kept him sidelined for the remainder of the 2002–03 season. Hill scored one league goal for the Latics, ironically against Tranmere. Hill was then given a £120,000 move to Stoke City during the summer of 2003.

Stoke City
Hill's first season at Stoke City was disrupted with injury and he was forced to sit out a lot of the 2003–04 season, making only nine first team starts and three substitute appearances. However Hill impressed during his second season at Stoke with his defensive ability and won the club's player of the year award for the 2004–05 season.

However, Hill's career at Stoke was hindered by recurring knee injuries, he damaged his anterior cruciate ligament towards the end of the 2004–05 season which prevented him from playing again until late into the 2005–06 season, however he made an immediate impact on his return, forging a strong partnership with Michael Duberry in central defence.

He found himself unable to hold down a regular first place during the 2006–07 season, with Danny Higginbotham and Michael Duberry preferred to him as first choice central defenders and Andy Griffin occupying the left-back slot. He made the majority of his appearances during the 2006–07 season as a stand-in left-back. However, Hill's season was brought to a premature end when he required a further operation on the same knee he injured in 2005.

He remained at Stoke for the first half of the following season, although he joined Crystal Palace on loan in October. Ironically, his last outing for Stoke was a late appearance as a substitute in a victory at Palace.

Crystal Palace

Hill's move to join Neil Warnock's Eagles was for an initial period of two months. After impressing hugely, he then made the move permanent for an undisclosed fee in January 2008. He established himself as first choice left back, and became a fan's favourite due to his professional and committed attitude. After an extremely successful first season at Palace, where they made the Play-off semi-finals, Hill continued his superb consistency in the 2008–09 season. Despite his performances, Palace finished in a disappointing 15th place in the Championship table. An equally disappointing season 2009–10 witnessed Palace in severe financial plight with a consequential ten points deduction and a final position in the division of 21st.

Queens Park Rangers
On 1 July 2010, Hill left Palace on a free transfer to join Queens Park Rangers and reunited with his former boss Neil Warnock. On 7 August 2010, Hill made his QPR debut in a 4–0 win over Barnsley where he got his first clean sheet. Hill scored his first goal for QPR against Portsmouth on 1 February 2011. Hill played over thirty games for the Hoops and made the left back position firmly his. He scored his second goal for QPR in a 2–0 home win against Ipswich Town, in a game where he also set up a goal for Heiðar Helguson to seal the win.

After QPR sealed the Championship title, Hill was able to play in the Premier League for the first time in his career. However, he was sent off on the opening day of the season for a headbutt on Martin Petrov of Bolton Wanderers in a 4–0 defeat at Loftus Road. On 20 September 2011, Hill signed for Nottingham Forest on a 93-day emergency loan deal, given squad number three. Due to injuries to Matthew Connolly and Danny Gabbidon, Hill was recalled early from his loan spell at Forest. Hill played for Forest five times. After his return from the loan spell, and the appointment of Mark Hughes as manager, Hill became a regular in the Rangers starting 11, forming a strong central defensive partnership with Anton Ferdinand. On 10 March 2012, Hill was denied what would have been his first Premier League goal when his header away to relegation rivals Bolton clearly crossed the line, but the linesman failed to spot this and a goal was not awarded. QPR went on to lose the game 2–1. Hill was 'gutted' about having been denied a first Premier League goal.

At the end of the 2011–12 season QPR survived on the final day of the season despite a 3–2 defeat to Manchester City. Hill was awarded both the fans and players player of the season awards for his outstanding performances for Rangers in the 2011–12 season. Hill's contract was due to expire in the summer of 2012 however Hill was keen to stay at Loftus Road. In May 2012, Hill was offered a new contract by QPR. On 19 June 2012 Clint signed a new one-year contract extension at the club until 2013.

The 2012–13 season saw Hill in and out of the starting 11 under Mark Hughes; however, he has been ever present in the team since Harry Redknapp took over as manager with Rangers in deep relegation trouble. He was handed the captaincy by Redknapp taking over from Park Ji-Sung. QPR failed to move out of the relegation zone and were relegated to the Championship after a 0–0 draw at Reading on 28 April 2013.

Hill remained captain for the 2013–14 season. He started games at both centre-back and left-back, scoring his first goal in two and a half years in the 1–0 win away to Leeds at Elland Road. He scored the winning goal once again on 2 November in a 2–1 victory over Derby County. Hill captained the team at Wembley as Rangers won the Championship Play-off final 1–0 against Derby County. Hill again signed a one-year deal to captain the club for their season back in the Premier League. On 7 April 2015 Hill scored his first Premier League goal, rising above the Aston Villa defence to head Matt Phillips' corner past Brad Guzan in the 55th minute to make the game 2–2, the final score was 3–3. After appearing 15 times in the 2015–16 season he was told his contract would not be renewed and as of now is a free agent. His last game for the R's was a 1–0 win at home to Bristol City, helping the club finish 12th in their first season back in the second tier.

Rangers
On 17 June 2016, Hill joined Scottish Premiership side Rangers on a one-year deal preceding his release from Queens Park Rangers. He made his debut for the club in a League Cup match against Annan Athletic on 19 July. In doing so, Hill became the oldest debutant in the club's history, aged . He broke a twenty-one-year-old record held by goalkeeper Billy Thomson who was aged  when he made his maiden Rangers appearance.

Hill scored his first goals for Rangers with a brace in a Scottish League Cup tie against Peterhead on 9 August 2016. He scored his first league goal for the club in a 1–1 draw with Ross County on 6 November. This goal, at the age of 38 years and 10 days, made Hill the oldest scorer in the Scottish Premiership since Lee Bullen netted at the age of 38 years and 238 days for Falkirk against Hamilton Academical in 2009. Hill was sent-off for the first time as a Rangers player, in injury time, during a league match against Aberdeen after receiving two cautions. After some solid displays for Rangers, Hill was linked to a move back to Queen's Park Rangers in December 2016, with the Loftus Road club reportedly seeking to sign him on a pre-contract agreement with a view to rejoining them on a free transfer in the summer of 2017.

Hill scored a late equaliser in the Old Firm derby against Celtic on 12 March 2017, as the match finished 1–1.

Carlisle United
Hill signed a short-term contract with Carlisle United in September 2017. In May 2018, he announced his retirement from football after leaving Carlisle United.

Coaching career
On 21 May 2018, he was appointed as joint First Team Coach at Fleetwood Town alongside former Rochdale manager Steve Eyre.

Hill left Fleetwood in January 2021 when then manager Joey Barton was relieved of his duties. On 22 February, he followed Barton and Andy Mangan to join Bristol Rovers. On 14 August 2021, following a 2–0 home defeat to Stevenage, it was announced that Hill had left the club due to personal family reasons.

In October 2021, Hill was appointed assistant manager at League Two club Hartlepool United. Hill left the club a month later following the departure of manager Dave Challinor. The following day Hill followed Challinor to Stockport County in the role of assistant manager.

Career statistics

Honours
Tranmere Rovers
League Cup runner-up: 1999–2000

Queens Park Rangers
Football League Championship: 2010–11; play-offs: 2013–14

Individual
John Greig Achievement Award (Rangers): 2016–17

References

External links

1978 births
Living people
People from Huyton
English footballers
Association football defenders
Tranmere Rovers F.C. players
Oldham Athletic A.F.C. players
Stoke City F.C. players
Crystal Palace F.C. players
Queens Park Rangers F.C. players
Nottingham Forest F.C. players
English Football League players
Premier League players
Rangers F.C. players
Carlisle United F.C. players
Scottish Professional Football League players
Fleetwood Town F.C. non-playing staff
Bristol Rovers F.C. non-playing staff
Hartlepool United F.C. non-playing staff
Stockport County F.C. non-playing staff
Footballers from Merseyside